Arthur Albert Lumberg  (20 May 1901 – date of death unknown), known as Bert Lumberg, was a Welsh international footballer. He was part of the Wales national football team between 1929 and 1931, playing 4 matches. He played his first match on 2 February 1929 against Ireland and his last match on 31 October 1931 against Scotland.

At club level, he played for Wrexham and Wolverhampton Wanderers.

See also
 List of Wales international footballers (alphabetical)

References

1901 births
Wrexham A.F.C. players
Wolverhampton Wanderers F.C. players
Welsh footballers
Wales international footballers
Place of birth missing
Year of death missing
Association footballers not categorized by position